The 2019 Glynhill Ladies International was held January 17 to 20, 2019 at the Braehead Curling Rink in Renfrew, Glasgow, Scotland as a part of the 2018–19 curling season. The event was held in a round robin format with the top eight teams advancing to the playoffs. The purse for the event was £ 11,000.

In an all Swiss final, Team Ursi Hegner of Uzwil defeated Team Elena Stern of Brig-Glis 5–3 to claim the event title. To reach the final, Hegner defeated Team Isabella Wranå of Sweden 5–4 in one semifinal and Stern beat Team Tova Sundberg, also of Sweden, 8–0 in the other.

Teams
The teams are listed as follows:

Round-robin standings
Final round-robin standings

Round-robin results
All draw times are listed in Greenwich Mean Time (UTC+00:00).

Draw 1
Thursday, January 17, 7:00 pm

Draw 2
Friday, January 18, 9:00 am

Draw 3
Friday, January 18, 12:30 pm

Draw 4
Friday, January 18, 4:00 pm

Draw 5
Saturday, January 19, 9:00 am

Draw 6
Saturday, January 19, 12:30 pm

Playoffs

Source:

Quarterfinals
Saturday, January 19, 4:00 pm

Semifinals
Sunday, January 20, 11:30 am

Final
Sunday, January 20, 2:30 pm

References

External links
Event Home

2019 in women's curling
International sports competitions in Glasgow
Women's curling competitions in Scotland
January 2019 sports events in the United Kingdom
Sport in Glasgow
2019 in Scottish women's sport